Anton Grimus (born 27 December 1990) is an Australian freestyle skier. He was born in Mansfield. He competed in ski cross at the World Ski Championships 2013, and at the 2014 Winter Olympics in Sochi, in ski-cross.

References

1990 births
Living people
Freestyle skiers at the 2014 Winter Olympics
Freestyle skiers at the 2018 Winter Olympics
Australian male freestyle skiers
Olympic freestyle skiers of Australia